George Aggudey (born 13 April 1945) is a Ghanaian politician. He is a member of the Convention People's Party (CPP).

Running as the CPP presidential candidate in the 7 December 2004 presidential election, he finished last out of four candidates, winning 1.0% of the vote. His running mate was Bright Kwame Ameyaw.

References

1945 births
Living people
Convention People's Party (Ghana) politicians
Candidates for President of Ghana